The Russian Army,, commonly known as the Army of Wrangel (Армия Врангеля, Армія Врангеля), was a White Army active in South Russia during the Russian Civil War from March to November 1920. It was officially formed on 28 April 1920 from the merger of several White armies, including the Volunteer Army, in a reorganization of the Armed Forces of South Russia. The Army of Wrangel, nicknamed after its commander General Pyotr Wrangel, fought against Bolshevik forces in the Southern Front and the Ukrainian War of Independence. In November 1920, following defeat at the Siege of Perekop and being vastly outnumbered, the Army of Wrangel organized a successful evacuation from Crimea and subsequently dissolved. Veterans of the army were among the founders of the Russian All-Military Union.

Composition
The Russian Army had a staff and five Army Corps:

Strength
 June 1920:  men. 
In September the combat troops of the army counted  to  men ( in mid-September). 

References

Military units and formations of White Russia (Russian Civil War)
Russian Civil War
Anti-communist organizations